Orthodera is a genus of praying mantises that can be found in Australia and Southeast Asia, with one species (Orthodera novaezealandiae) said to be the only native species of mantis of New Zealand.

Species
Orthodera australiana Giglio-Tos, 1917 Australia, New Zealand?
Orthodera burmeisteri Wood-Mason, 1889 Australia, New Zealand?, New Guinea, Micronesia
Orthodera gracilis Giglio-Tos, 1917 Australia
Orthodera gunnii Le Guillou, 1841 Australia, Tasmania
Orthodera insularis Beier, 1952 Sumba
Orthodera ministralis Fabricius, 1775 (garden mantis) Australia, New Zealand, Hawaii
Orthodera novaezealandiae Colenso, 1882 (New Zealand mantis) New Zealand
Orthodera rubrocoxata Serville, 1839 Australia
Orthodera timorensis Werner, 1933 Timor

See also
List of mantis genera and species

References

Mantidae
Mantodea of Oceania
Insects of Australia